The 2022 Adelaide International 1 was a tennis tournament on the 2022 ATP Tour and 2022 WTA Tour. It was a combined ATP Tour 250 and WTA 500 tournament played on outdoor hard courts at the redeveloped Memorial Drive Tennis Centre in Adelaide, South Australia in Australia. This was the third edition of the tournament for the women and the second edition for the men. The tournament took place at the Memorial Drive Tennis Centre from 3–9 January 2022 and was followed a week later by the 2022 Adelaide International 2, a combined ATP Tour 250 and WTA 250 tournament, at the same venue.

Ashleigh Barty and Gaël Monfils were crowned the women's and men's singles champions, respectively. Iga Świątek was the defending champion in women's singles and Andrey Rublev was the defending champion in men's singles from when the men's tournaments were last held in 2020. Neither player defended their title after Świątek lost to Barty in the semifinals, and Rublev did not return to compete. By winning the women's doubles tournament as well, Barty notched a third occasion where she won both the singles and doubles titles at the same tournament.

Champions

Men's singles 

  Gaël Monfils def.  Karen Khachanov, 6–4, 6–4

Women's singles 

  Ashleigh Barty def.  Elena Rybakina 6–3, 6–2

Men's doubles 

  Rohan Bopanna /  Ramkumar Ramanathan def.  Ivan Dodig /  Marcelo Melo 7–6(8–6), 6–1

Women's doubles 

  Ashleigh Barty /  Storm Sanders def.  Darija Jurak Schreiber /  Andreja Klepač 6–1, 6–4

Points and prize money

Point distribution

*per team

Prize money 

*per team

ATP singles main-draw entrants

Seeds

 1 Rankings are as of 27 December 2021.

Other entrants 
The following players received wildcards into the singles main draw:
  Alex Bolt
  Thanasi Kokkinakis
  Aleksandar Vukic

The following players received entry from the qualifying draw:
  Francisco Cerúndolo
  Taro Daniel
  Egor Gerasimov
  Holger Rune

Withdrawals
Before the tournament
  Ugo Humbert → replaced by  Juan Manuel Cerúndolo
  Miomir Kecmanović → replaced by  Mikael Ymer
  Sebastian Korda → replaced by  Thiago Monteiro
  Arthur Rinderknech → replaced by  Corentin Moutet

ATP doubles main-draw entrants

Seeds

 1 Rankings are as of 27 December 2021.

Other entrants
The following pairs received wildcards into the doubles main draw:
  Alex Bolt /  Thanasi Kokkinakis
  Aleksandar Vukic /  Edward Winter

Withdrawals 
Before the tournament
  Boris Arias /  Federico Zeballos → replaced by  Daniel Altmaier /  Juan Pablo Varillas
  Andrea Arnaboldi /  Alessandro Giannessi → replaced by  Gianluca Mager /  Lorenzo Musetti
  Rohan Bopanna /  Édouard Roger-Vasselin → replaced by  Rohan Bopanna /  Ramkumar Ramanathan
  Benjamin Bonzi /  Arthur Rinderknech → replaced by  Benjamin Bonzi /  Hugo Nys
  Evan King /  Alex Lawson → replaced by  Alex Lawson /  Jiří Veselý
  Frederik Nielsen /  Mikael Ymer → replaced by  Frederik Nielsen /  Treat Huey

WTA singles main-draw entrants

Seeds 

 1 Rankings are as of 27 December 2021.

Other entrants 
The following players received wildcards into the singles main draw:
  Priscilla Hon
  Storm Sanders

The following players received entry from the qualifying draw:
  Marie Bouzková
  Lucia Bronzetti
  Ulrikke Eikeri
  Maddison Inglis
  Despina Papamichail
  Daria Saville

Withdrawals
Before the tournament
  Belinda Bencic → replaced by  Kaja Juvan
  Ons Jabeur → replaced by  Shelby Rogers
  Barbora Krejčíková → replaced by  Ajla Tomljanović
  Garbiñe Muguruza → replaced by  Kristína Kučová
  Jeļena Ostapenko → replaced by  Misaki Doi
  Karolína Plíšková → replaced by  Heather Watson

WTA doubles main-draw entrants

Seeds 

 1 Rankings are as of 27 December 2021.

Other entrants
The following pair received a wildcard into the doubles main draw:
  Priscilla Hon /  Charlotte Kempenaers-Pocz

Withdrawals 
Before the tournament
  Alexa Guarachi /  Nicole Melichar-Martinez → replaced by  Sofia Kenin /  Nicole Melichar-Martinez
  Lyudmyla Kichenok /  Jeļena Ostapenko → replaced by  Kateryna Bondarenko /  Lyudmyla Kichenok
  Desirae Krawczyk /  Bethanie Mattek-Sands → replaced by  Ashleigh Barty /  Storm Sanders

During the tournament
  Victoria Azarenka /  Paula Badosa (right leg injury - Azarenka)
  Leylah Fernandez /  Erin Routliffe (lower back injury - Fernandez)

Retirements 
  Marie Bouzková /  Lucie Hradecká

See also

 South Australian Championships 
 Australian Hard Court Championships
 Australian Open Series

References

External links 
 
Entry list
 WTA tournament Official website

2022 WTA Tour
2022 ATP Tour
2022
Adel
January 2022 sports events in Australia